The Chevrolet Beach Volleyball Centre was a temporary beach volleyball facility built at Exhibition Place (parking lot south of BMO Field) for the 2015 Pan American Games in Toronto, Ontario, Canada. The venue hosted the beach volleyball competitions at the games from July 13–21. A total of 3,000 metric tonnes of sand was used to build the temporary courts.

The courts were removed following the games in preparation for the Marketplace venue for the 2015 Canadian National Exhibition.

Photo gallery

References

External links
 Toronto 2015 - Chevrolet Beach Volleyball Centre Page
 

Venues of the 2015 Pan American Games
Sports venues in Toronto
Defunct sports venues in Toronto